Bostina  is a village in the municipality of Smolyan, located in the Smolyan Province of southern Bulgaria. The village covers an area of 4.77 km2 and is located 168.3 km from Sofia. In 2007, the village had a population of 125.

References

Villages in Smolyan Province